Kutuzovskaya is a Moscow Metro station. It was completed in 1958 as the first westward extension of the newly created Filyovskaya line, which also included the reopening of four older stations which had been closed since 1953. Kutuzovskaya was the first permanent grade-level Metro station, part of a cost-cutting experiment which was ultimately doomed by Moscow's harsh climate. Kutuzovskaya's side platforms and curving layout are both unusual features. A large percentage of both platforms is covered by Kutuzovskiy Prospekt, an avenue which crosses over the station midway along its length. Entrance vestibules on either side of the overpass allow passengers to change platforms.

Kutuzovskaya was designed by Yuriy Zenkevich and Robert Pogrebnoi.

External links
metro.ru
mymetro.ru
KartaMetro.info — Station location and exits on Moscow map (English/Russian)

Moscow Metro stations
Railway stations in Russia opened in 1958
Filyovskaya Line